Bling! Bling! is the second studio album released by Alabama rock group Lynam.  The tracks "Losing Venus" and "Never Fade Away" were later re-released on the band's fourth studio album, Slave to the Machine.  "Disco King" and "Bemused" originally appeared on Fame Among the Vulgar, the second album released by lead singer Jacob Bunton's first band, Mars Electric.  Currently, if you purchase the album from iTunes, the track "Punk" has been replaced by "Left for Dead."

Track listing
 Della
 Disco King
 Waste My Life
 Dixie River Gun Runners
 Bemused
 Gonna Getchoo
 It's All Over Now
 Losing Venus
 Never Fade Away
 Punk
 Left for Dead (iTunes only)

2002 albums
Lynam (band) albums